The United Confederate Veterans (UCV, or simply Confederate Veterans) was an American Civil War veterans' organization headquartered in New Orleans, Louisiana. It was organized on June 10, 1889, by ex-soldiers and sailors of the Confederate States of America as a merger between the Louisiana Division of the Veteran Confederate States Cavalry Association; N. B. Forrest Camp of Chattanooga, Tennessee; Tennessee Division of the Veteran Confederate States Cavalry Association; Tennessee Division of Association of Confederate Soldiers; Benevolent Association of Confederate Veterans of Shreveport, Louisiana; Confederate Association of Iberville Parish, Louisiana; Eighteenth Louisiana; Adams County (Mississippi) Veterans' Association; Louisiana Division of the Army of Tennessee; and Louisiana Division of the Army of Northern Virginia.

The U.S. equivalent of the UCV was the Grand Army of the Republic.

History

Background
There had been numerous local veterans associations in the Southern United States, many of which became part of the UCV. The organization proliferated throughout the 1890s, culminating with 1,555 camps at the 1898 reunion. The next few years marked the zenith of UCV membership, lasting until 1903 or 1904 when veterans started to die off and the organization gradually declined.

Purpose
The UCV outlined its purposes and structure in a written constitution based on military lines. Members holding appropriate UCV "ranks" officered and staffed echelons of command from General Headquarters at the top to local camps (companies) at the bottom. Their declared purpose was emphatically nonmilitary – to foster "social, literary, historical, and benevolent" ends.

The UCV sponsored Florida's Tribute to the Women of the Confederacy (1915).

Reunions

The national organization assembled annually in a general convention and social reunion presided over by the Commander-in-Chief. These annual reunions served the UCV as an aid in achieving its goals. Convention cities made elaborate preparations and tried to put on bigger events than the previous hosts. The gatherings continued to be held long after the membership peak had passed, and despite fewer veterans surviving, they gradually grew in attendance, length, and splendor. Numerous veterans brought family and friends along, further swelling the crowds. Many Southerners considered the conventions significant social occasions. Perhaps thirty thousand veterans and another fifty thousand visitors attended each of the mid- and late-1890 reunions, and the numbers increased. In 1911, an estimated crowd of 106,000 members and guests crammed into Little Rock, Arkansas—a city of less than one-half that size. Then the passing years began taking a telling toll, and the reunions grew smaller. But still, the meetings continued until, in 1950, at the sixtieth reunion, only one member could attend, 98-year-old Commander-in-Chief James Moore of Selma, Alabama. The following year, 1951, the United Confederate Veterans held its sixty-first and final reunion in Norfolk, Virginia, from May 30 to June 3. Three members attended: William Townsend, John B. Salling, and William Bush. The U.S. Post Office Department issued a 3-cent commemorative stamp in conjunction with that final reunion. The last verified Confederate veteran, Pleasant Crump, died at age 104 on December 31, 1951.

The Confederate Veteran
In addition to national meetings, another prominent factor contributed to the growth and popularity of the UCV. This monthly magazine became the official UCV organ, the Confederate Veteran. Founded as an independent publishing venture in January 1893 by Sumner Archibald Cunningham, the UCV adopted it the following year. Cunningham personally edited the magazine for twenty-one years and bequeathed almost his entire estate to ensure its continuance. The magazine was of very high quality, and circulation was wide. Many veterans penned recollections or articles for publication on its pages. Readership always greatly exceeded circulation because numerous camps and soldiers' homes received one or two copies for their numerous occupants. For example, an average of 6500 copies were printed per issue during the first year of publication, but Cunningham estimated that fifty thousand people read the twelfth issue.

See also

 Confederate Memorial Day
 List of Confederate monuments and memorials
 Grand Army of the Republic
 Confederate Memorial Hall
 Confederate Memorial Hall Museum
 Southern Cross of Honor
 Lost Cause of the Confederacy
 Louisiana in the American Civil War
 Sons of Confederate Veterans, headquartered in Columbia, Tennessee
 United Daughters of the Confederacy

Notes

References
 Cimbala, Paul A. Veterans North and South: The Transition from Soldier to Civilian after the American Civil War (Santa Barbara: Praeger, 2015). xviii, 189 pp.
 Dorgan, Howard. "Rhetoric of the United Confederate Veterans: A lost cause mythology in the making." in Oratory in the New South (1979): 143–73.
 Hattaway, Herman. "The United Confederate Veterans in Louisiana." Louisiana History: The Journal of the Louisiana Historical Association 16.1 (1975): 5–37. in JSTOR
 
 Marten, James Alan. Sing Not War: The Lives of Union & Confederate Veterans in Gilded Age America (Univ of North Carolina Press, 2011).

Primary sources

External links

 1914 Confederate Veterans Convention at The World Digital Library
 Confederate Veteran Organizations at the New Georgia Encyclopedia
 Minutes of the Annual Meetings and Reunions of the United Confederate Veterans at the Online Books Page
 Organization of Camps in the United Confederate Veterans at the Online Books Page
 United Confederate Veterans Association Records at Louisiana State University
 United Confederate Veterans Collection at James Madison University
 United Confederate Veterans Politicians at The Political Graveyard
 United Confederate Veterans Reunions held in Memphis at Historic-Memphis
 United Confederate Veterans Reunion of 1911 at Encyclopedia of Arkansas
 United Confederate Veterans Reunion of 1928 at Encyclopedia of Arkansas
 United Confederate Veterans Reunion of 1949 at Encyclopedia of Arkansas
 United Confederate Veterans Tennessee Division Records at the Tennessee State Library and Archives
 United Confederate Veterans Virginia Division Records at the Library of Virginia
 United Confederate Veterans (UCV) at Encyclopedia of Arkansas
 

 
1889 establishments in Louisiana
1951 disestablishments in Virginia
Aftermath of the American Civil War
American Civil War veterans and descendants organizations
Defunct clubs and societies of the United States
Defunct organizations based in Louisiana
Neo-Confederate organizations
Organizations established in 1889
Organizations disestablished in 1951